Anna Galvan (née Veronese; born 20 November 1978 in Christchurch, New Zealand) is a retired New Zealand netball player.

Domestic career 
Galvan had a long netball career, spanning 17 years. During this time she played for two National Bank Cup franchises as a defender, with the Canterbury Flames (1997–2002) and the Southern Sting (2003–2006). She was a key defender in the champion Southern Sting's success as well as performing for her original Flames. However, she had a break from netball at the end of the 2006 season to have her second child and a third child was born in 2008. Galvan was enticed to return to top-level competition by signing with the Canterbury Tactix for the 2010 season of the ANZ Championship. She retired from all netball at the completion of the 2014 ANZ championship Season.

International netball 
Galvan has had previous international netball experience including being part of the Silver Ferns from 2002 to 2003. She competed at the 2002 Commonwealth Games in Manchester where the Silver Ferns lost the Gold Medal match to Australia in heartbreaking fashion, losing in double extra time. Falling pregnant just after the 2002 Commonwealth Games meant that she had to pull out of the Silver Ferns team going to the Netball World Cup, being replaced by Leana de Bruin who retained the position. Galvan was also part of the New Zealand Under 21 team who went to the World Youth Cup in Canada in 1996, coming second to Australia in the final. She was part of the NZU21's from 1995 - 1998 and the New Zealand A Team in 2000, 2001, 2004 (Captain) and 2005.

Family 
Anna and her husband Hugh Galvan have three children. Her eldest, Isabella, is following in her mother's footsteps in competitive netball.

References 

New Zealand netball players
New Zealand international netball players
Mainland Tactix players
Commonwealth Games silver medallists for New Zealand
1978 births
Living people
ANZ Championship players
Commonwealth Games medallists in netball
Netball players at the 2002 Commonwealth Games
Netball players from Christchurch
Southern Sting players
Canterbury Flames players
Medallists at the 2002 Commonwealth Games